StormBreaker Brewing is a brewery based in Portland, Oregon. Rob Lutz and Dan Malech established the company in 2014.  The original restaurant is located on North Mississippi Avenue in the Boise neighborhood, and a second opened in the St. Johns neighborhood in 2018.

Beers have included a pumpkin ale called Pumpkin Pedaler. The menu has included burgers and grilled cheese, waffle-cut potato chips, arugula-pear-beet salad, and flank steak with broccolini, cauliflower, lentils, or potatoes as sides. The happy hour menu has included chips and salsa, macaroni and cheese, pickles, and a "smorgasboard" with honey-drizzled blue cheese, porcine terrine, and poultry pâté.

Both locations offered outdoor dining during the COVID-19 pandemic. The business was included in Eater Portland's 2022 "Handy Dining Guide to North Mississippi Avenue".

References

External links 

 
 

2014 establishments in Oregon
Beer brewing companies based in Portland, Oregon
Boise, Portland, Oregon
North Portland, Oregon
Restaurants established in 2014
Restaurants in Portland, Oregon
St. Johns, Portland, Oregon